Nagaon is a village in Barpeta district, situated in the north bank of the river Brahmaputra.

Transport
The village is near Hajo Doulashal road (National Highway 427) and connected to nearby towns and cities like Barpeta, Hajo and Guwahati with regular buses and other modes of transportation.

Notable people 
 Mahendra Mohan Choudhry, former Governor of Punjab and former Chief Minister of Assam

See also
 Tukrapara
 Tupamari

References

Villages in Barpeta district